The global minimum corporate tax rate, or simply the global minimum tax (abbreviated GMCT or GMCTR), is a minimum rate of tax on corporate income internationally agreed upon and accepted by individual jurisdictions. Each country would be eligible to a share of revenue generated by the tax. The aim is to reduce tax competition between countries and discourage multinational corporations (MNC) from profit shifting to achieve tax avoidance.

Global minimum tax 2023 
On 8 October 2021, 136 countries agreed to a plan of Organisation for Economic Co-operation and Development (OECD) to implement 15% global minimum tax rate, starting in 2023. 4 countries are yet to sign up (Kenya, Nigeria, Pakistan, and Sri Lanka). A two-pillar solution has been implemented by the OECD to address issues connected to digitalization of the economy.
Consenting governments are currently discussing implementation plans and turning the agreement into law. For example, the European Union is on its way to developing new rules for this new agreement and getting deadlines for the implementation. A unanimous agreement among the 27 EU member states is still required but it should be done by 2023. For Switzerland, a constitutional amendment is required to adopt this new accord, and it will likely wait until 2024 for the Swiss rules to change. Finally, the United States is studying changes to its own approach but it is not yet known when these changes will be adopted.

Why was it imposed? 
International tax rules developed in the environment of the last century do not fit the purpose of the modern economy. Digitalisation has created new problems: scale without mass (growth of firms without physical presence), reliance on intangible assets or centrality of data. The previous and new technologies have facilitated tax avoidance through profit shifting to low-tax jurisdictions. The result is a “race to the bottom”, a tax competition among countries to attract foreign investment. This is causing loss of tax revenue and the endangerment of government functions in higher-tax countries.

How will the tax operate? 
The tax works on a two-pillar system which should improve current corporate taxation rules. These rules prevent countries from taxing MNCs' income generated in their jurisdictions unless MNCs have nexus (physical presence) in that country.

Pillar one (Reallocation of profits) 
Pillar one is concerned with new profit allocation rules applying to the largest and most profitable MNCs with worldwide revenue greater than €20 billion and profitability above 10%. This amount could also be in 7 years reduced to €10 billion if the implementation succeeds.

This pillar redistributes excess profits of MNCs to jurisdictions, where consumers or users are located, regardless of whether firms are in those jurisdictions physically present. The amount redistributed will be computed as 20-30% of the residual profits of companies in scope. This should result in fairer distribution of profits and taxing rights among countries. Taxing rights on more than $125 billion of profit should be reallocated to market jurisdictions each year.

Pillar two (global minimum corporate tax of 15%) 
The pillar two introduces a new global minimum corporate tax of 15% for corporations in scope. It will apply to multinational groups with revenue exceeding EUR 750 million. This regime is estimated to generate around US$150 billion additional tax revenues annually. It addresses the relationship between parent MNCs and their subsidiaries. If the MNC's subsidiary has low-taxed income, then the MNC must pay a top-up tax to increase the tax rate related to the income to 15%. According to current rules subsidiaries located in tax havens pay little to no taxes. This will not be possible in the future. The global minimum tax consists of three principal rules: inclusion rule (IIR), the undertaxed payments rule (UTPR) and the subject to tax rule (STTR). IIR works in a similar and complementary fashion as the UTPR. Both refer to the already mentioned 15% minimum effective tax rate. Together they are referred to as GloBe.

Income inclusion rule (IIR) 
The IIR is the primary rule. It will be applied and collected in the jurisdiction of the parent MNC. However, it will not apply to the head office itself. This rule introduces a top-up tax which is applied to the head office if the effective tax rate of all the consolidated companies and branches in each jurisdiction doesn't reach the minimum tax of 15%. The top-up tax is then based on the minimum tax. This rule should ensure that the MNC group is subject to a minimum tax regardless of where it is headquartered and without giving risk to double or over taxation.

Undertaxed payments rule (UTPR) 
The UTPR is applied after IIR and serves as a backstop to the IIR in circumstances where the Income inclusion rule is ineffective. This rule is applied, when the parent MNC is located in a low tax jurisdiction or is located or when the ownership entity is located in a jurisdiction, which has not implemented the IIR. In that case the top-up tax will be collected by the countries in which other group companies are located.

Subject to tax rule (STTR) 
The STTR is the Third Pillar 2 rule. It is a treaty-based rule that allows countries to tax payments that might face a rate of tax above the minimum level granted. The STTR tax rate would be withheld between 7.5% to 9%. If a jurisdiction does not levy a tax on certain payments to an adequate level, then the jurisdiction of the payer is allowed to excise the top-up withholding tax. These certain payments include only payments made between connected person such as interest, royalties, brokerage, financial fees, rent, insurance etc. Where the payments consist of multiple elements (e.g. royalty plus a payment for service), the rule is only applied to the element within scope.

The STTR, the IIR, and the UTPR differ at some points:

•	First, STTR can be applied regardless of the group size. (i.e., the EUR 750 million thresholds may not apply)

•	Second, the STTR only applies to certain categories of related party payments

•	Third, the STTR applies on a payment-by-payment basis and not in a general application under the global minimum tax.[8]

The studied pillars, Pillar 1 and Pillar 2, both represent a big change when it comes to the international tax rules. By 2023, countries are required to debate these new changes in order to set new laws to adapt to the new situation.

Impact on countries with low corporate income tax 
If countries with CIT lower than 15% decide to do nothing, they might lose out on taxing rights. These taxing rights on locally generated income might go to another country. For example, if the parent MNC is located in a low tax jurisdiction which has not implemented the IIR, then the top-up tax will be calculated by the next intermediary holding company in the ownership chain. In this case the low tax jurisdiction would lose out on tax revenue over which it would have had primary taxing rights.

Countries with low or no CIT might take different approaches:

 Maintain status quo and not implement globally agreed Pillar two. This is unlikely for countries included in the OECD agreement
 Raise current CIT to meet 15%
 Create divided tax policies, where the global minimum tax would apply to only MNC meeting the EUR750m threshold.  

For that reason, tax havens such as British Virgin Islands or the Cayman Islands will no longer have incentive to offer reduced or zero tax rates to MNC and will have to increase their headline corporate tax rates making them less attractive to multi-national companies.

History 
In 1992 a minimum corporate tax rate was proposed on a regional scale for the European Union member states. The proposal was made by the Ruding Committee in 1992, a European Commission expert panel led by Onno Ruding. The committee's proposal, of a 30% minimum tax, was however not implemented.

2021 statement 
In 2019, the OECD, an intergovernmental association of mostly rich countries, began proposing a global minimum corporate tax rate. It argued that the increasing global economic significance of digital products and services requires an update to taxation rules to prevent companies from shifting profits to jurisdictions with a lower corporate tax rate. The OECD formed a group, called Inclusive Framework, that has since been exploring a minimum tax rate among its member states.

In May 2019, Germany and France published a joint proposal for a global minimum effective tax rate named Pillar Two, with the goal of stopping the race to the bottom. Olaf Scholz, then-German Federal Minister of Finance, called the fair taxation of companies one of the main priorities of Germany's presidency of the OECD's Committee on Fiscal Affairs and said that if no agreement can be reached within the OECD, the EU is prepared to take action unilaterally. This Franco-German proposal received wide international support, and both the then-IMF Managing Director Christine Lagarde as well as the then-OECD Secretary-General Angel Gurría endorsed it.

In 2020, the group's then 137 member states called the blueprint for Pillar Two "a solid basis for a systemic solution that would address remaining base erosion and profit shifting (BEPS) challenges". The United States joined the talks of the OECD/G20 group on (tax-) Base Erosion and Profit Shifting in 2020, and in April 2021, Janet Yellen, the United States Treasury Secretary, agreed with the Franco-German proposal.

In June 2021, a meeting of the Group of Seven finance ministers in the leadup to the 2021 G7 Summit endorsed a global minimum corporate tax rate of at least 15% on the 100 largest multinational companies to disincentivize a race to the bottom by countries to attract such multinationals. French Finance Minister Bruno Le Maire described the 15% threshold as a starting point that could be raised in the future. Yellen described the pledge as positive for the world economy by leveling the playing field and encouraging positive competition. The chief executive of the Tax Justice Network said that the deal was historic, but unfair and should have been at least 25%. Liu Kun, China's Minister of Finance, said in 2021 that the planned agreement would help create a "fair and sustainable" international tax system.

On 1 July 2021, 130 countries backed an OECD plan to set a global minimum corporate tax rate of 15 per cent.

On 8 October 2021, the EU members Republic of Ireland, Hungary, and Estonia agreed to the OECD plan under the condition that the 15% tax rate will not be raised. The 8 October 2021 statement is called Statement on a Two-Pillar Solution to Address the Tax Challenges Arising from the Digitalisation of the Economy. 137 countries in total have approved it. For implementation, it has to be approved by the signatory countries' parliaments.

It is a worldwide effort to keep multinational firms from dodging taxes by shifting their profits to countries with low rates. The agreement is an attempt to address challenges presented by a globalized and increasingly digital world economy in which profits can be relocated across borders and companies can earn online profits in places where they have no taxable headquarters. French Finance Minister Bruno Le Maire called it "the most important international tax agreement in a century."

Implementation 
, the UK and Japan have drafted implementation guidelines for the agreement, while the overwhelming majority of other signatories has not yet taken steps in implementing the agreement.

Criticism
University of California, Berkeley professor Gabriel Zucman applauded the OECD efforts to eliminate corporate tax havens, but criticized the proposed minimum tax rate of 15%, a rate lower than the average combined federal and state income tax rates paid by individual Americans. In Zucman's opinion, a 15% minimum rate would be too small, and recommended raising the minimum rate to 25%, since large corporations could afford the higher minimum rate.

Darin Tuttle, Chief Investment Officer of Tuttle Ventures, publicly cast doubt on the initiative, stating that he believes it's impossible to enforce globally and any smart country outside of the G7 would immediately lower its corporate tax rate to reap the benefits of foreign direct investment.

Global taxes vs digital taxes 
Part of this global minimum corporate tax rate deal seems to prevent another trade war over digital taxes. A digital services tax (DST), which is a tax on selected gross revenue streams of large digital companies, has been set in some European countries in order to tax digital services. The DSTs have been agreed upon by the OECD and they differ in their structure. For example, Austria and Hungary only tax revenues from online advertising while France includes also the revenues from a provision of a digital interface and the transmission of data collected about users for advertising purposes. These tax rates are between 1.5% to 7.5%.

After the deal on the global minimum corporate tax rate, the communique that the finance ministers agreed to does say that ultimately the idea is to remove all digital services taxes that are in place to avoid double taxation. However, both Canada and the European Union insist on having their own digital taxes, which complicates the situation. Also, this could be a very tricky issue from a political perspective because, from the previous administration, the United States has issues with the idea of digital tax, in the sense that most of these digital companies are Americans and they don't want these firms to be disproportionately targeted.

See also 

 Tax competition, which may lead to a race to the bottom between countries
 List of countries by tax rates for a comparison of corporate tax rates around the world, and Tax rates in Europe for just the continent
 Corporate haven, a country with low effective tax rates for corporations
 World taxation system
 International taxation

References

External links 
 Statement on a Two-Pillar Solution to Address the Tax Challenges Arising from the Digitalisation of the Economy: Full text at the OECD website
 

Corporate taxation
Corporate tax avoidance
Fiscal policy